Kalam Mooniaruck (born 22 November 1983) is an English-born Mauritian footballer who played as a winger. He played non-League football in England and played two matches for the Mauritius national football team.

Playing career
Mooniaruck was a member of the youth team at Norwich City, before signing for Manchester United on 3 March 1999 at the age of 13; United attempted to get around the rule that youth team players had to live within 90 minutes of the club by flying him to Manchester from Stansted Airport, and although the Football Association later clarified that it had to be a 90-minute drive, Mooniaruck remained at United. He was released in June 2003 without a single appearance for the first team, despite playing for England U-20 in a friendly match against Germany U-20.

After his release, Mooniaruck had unsuccessful trials with Rotherham United, Queens Park Rangers, Grimsby Town, Wycombe Wanderers, Swindon Town, Sheffield Wednesday and Leyton Orient, before signing for Braintree in August 2003. He was released early in 2004 after the club stated that his skills and style of playing were not suited for the Isthmian League. Following an unsuccessful trial with Cambridge United, He later joined local club Bishop's Stortford Swifts in the same year, playing for the club until 2006.

In August 2006 Kalam joined Cambridge City, before moving to Thurrock in January 2007 and signing for Saffron Walden Town before the end of the season when he announced retirement to become a coach for a David Beckham's football school. He came out of retirement to sign for Tiptree United in 2008, playing two games before leaving football.

International career
Born in England with Mauritian heritage, he played for England U-20 in 2001. In 2005, he played two matches for the Mauritius national football team.

Coaching career
Mooniaruck is currently Head of Coaching Development at West Ham United.

References

1983 births
Living people
People from Yeovil
Mauritian footballers
England youth international footballers
Mauritius international footballers
English footballers
Association football midfielders
Braintree Town F.C. players
Cambridge City F.C. players
Thurrock F.C. players
Saffron Walden Town F.C. players
Tiptree United F.C. players
West Ham United F.C. non-playing staff
Association football coaches